Rás 2 (Channel 2) is an Icelandic radio station belonging to the National Icelandic Broadcasting Service, RÚV. 

Launched on 1 December 1983, it is currently the highest-rated radio station in Iceland, with a schedule composed chiefly of news, current affairs, and pop and rock music. Rás 2 is broadcast throughout the country from a network of 90 FM transmitters (99.9 MHz is the channel's main frequency in Reykjavík), via Satellite and also streamed on the Internet.

Logos

See also
 Rás 1
 RÚV

References

External links
 

Radio stations in Iceland
Companies based in Reykjavík
Radio stations established in 1983